Lara is a town in Victoria, 18 km north-east of the Geelong CBD, inland from the Princes Freeway to Melbourne. Its population at the 2016 census was 16,355.

History

The explorers Hume and Hovell arrived at Lara on December 16, 1824, believing that they had reached Westernport Bay. They recorded that the Aboriginals described the bay as Djillong and land as Corayo, suggesting origins for the names of Geelong and Corio.

The area was originally named Kennedy's Creek but was also given several different names including Duck Ponds, Hovell's Creek, Cheddar, Swindon and Lara Lake. The area of Lara was no more than a few farms at this time.

The railway through the town was opened in 1857 along with the local railway station, with several subdivisions then announced. A Post Office opened on 1 March 1858 as Duck Ponds, renamed Hovell's Creek in 1872, and finally Lara in 1884.
The population grew to a few hundred by 1890, and several facilities like schools and churches were built, but a municipal water supply was not completed until 1947.

In January 1969, 17 people were killed in bushfires which ravaged Lara. Most of the victims were trapped by the fast-moving grass fire while travelling on the Princes Highway.

Several scenes from the 1979 feature film Mad Max were shot on location around Lara, as well as several scenes from the Australian Broadcasting Corporation mockumentary We Can Be Heroes: Finding The Australian of the Year, in which the town carried the fictional name "Dunt".

The town's history is being preserved at the Lara Museum and Historical Centre on the corner of Forest and Canterbury Roads. This historic property, formerly the Lake Bank Hotel (circa 1860), was renovated by local businessman Lino Bisinella and provided in 2013 to the community group which runs the museum, Lara Heritage and Historical Inc.

Heritage listed sites
Lara contains a number of heritage listed sites, including:
 605 Bacchus Marsh Road, Elcho Homestead
 Princes Highway, Hume and Hovell Monument
 108 Windermere Road, Pirra Homestead

Population
According to the 2016 census, there were 16,355 people in Lara.
 Aboriginal and Torres Strait Islander people made up 1.4% of the population. 
 80.1% of people were born in Australia. The next most common countries of birth were England 3.9%, Philippines 1.4%, New Zealand 1.0%, Scotland 0.8% and Vietnam 0.6%.   
 81.9% of people spoke only English at home. Other languages spoken at home included Croatian 0.7%, Tagalog 0.7% and Italian 0.7%. 
 The most common responses for religion were No Religion 31.8% and Catholic 26.2%.

Geography
Hovell's Creek runs through Lara and ends at Limeburners Bay, a small inlet of Corio Bay. Granite peaks known as the You Yangs, 4 kilometres north of Lara, rise dramatically to a height of 352m and can be seen from most areas of Geelong.

Education
Lara offers education through its three primary schools; St. Anthony's Primary School, Lara Lake Primary School and Lara Primary School. Lara Secondary College, which accommodates years 7 - 12 and the VCE, opened in 2004. Lara is also home to Avalon College, a school for International Students preparing them for traditional schools.

Industry

On Lara's outskirts are industry parks and two prisons – the maximum security HM Prison Barwon, opened in January 1990, and the medium security Marngoneet Correctional Centre, opened 3 March 2006. The former Pirra Homestead, a home for girls age 13 to 18, part of the Victorian youth welfare system, closed during the 1980s.

It includes 119 fully self-contained units, 17 apartments and a holiday unit. A more recent development on the eastern edge of Lara is Lakeside Lara, "a retirement or over 55's lifestyle community" with more than 200 cottages.

Ford Australia operates a proving grounds for automotive testing and evaluation at the north end of the You Yangs.

Transport
Lara has regular V/Line passenger train services on the Geelong line to Melbourne and Geelong to cater for the many residents who commute to work each day via Lara railway station. Lara has become a popular place to live for those wishing to work in Melbourne and have ties to Geelong. After the extension of Myki ticketing to the Geelong line in 2013, Lara became a Myki Zone 2, 3 & 4 station. Following the introduction of 20-minute off-peak services in 2015, there has been an increase in passenger traffic by train between Geelong and Lara.

Under contract to Public Transport Victoria, CDC Geelong operates bus services in the Lara area on routes 10, 11 and 12, running to and from Lara station. Taxis are also available.

Avalon Airport is nearby but there is no regular public transport from Lara station to the airport terminal.

Amenities
Lara has a post office, two banks, several hairdressers, a barber, a travel agency, a butcher, a greengrocer, a Woolworths supermarket (opened in 2016) and a Coles supermarket. The Coles supermarket opened in December 2014 as part of the town centre expansion on the site of Austin Park, as well as a re-alignment of Waverley Road to create a more spacious site for the supermarket and the re-configuration of the park. There are four real estate agencies and one newsagency. The Lara Library opened in 2011.

There are several eat-in bakery/coffee/cake shops, three Thai restaurants, an Indian restaurant, three pizza shops, three fish-and-chip shops, McDonald's, Subway, three Chinese and noodle shops and other take-aways. There are two petrol stations, both of which are open for business 24 hours a day, seven days a week.

Lodging and entertainment are provided by a pub/hotel, sports club, and a lawn bowls club.

Sport
Lara has an Australian rules football team competing in the Geelong Football League. There are two soccer clubs in Lara: North Geelong Warriors FC play in the National Premier Leagues Victoria 2 and Lara United FC play in division 5 of the Victorian State League. Lara is also home to the Lara Giants Basketball club that was established in 1992 and competes in Geelong United Basketball association. 
 
Lara Golf Club (known as Elcho Park Golf Club until 2014) is an 18 hole course and driving range on Elcho Road.

See also
 Avalon Airport
 Avalon Raceway
 Serendip Sanctuary

References

External links

Lara - City of Greater Geelong
Lara Museum
Lara Weather

Suburbs of Geelong